Kirk Leroy Miller professionally known as Leroy Miller (born February 19, 1965) is an American musician from Spokane, Washington.

Career
Leroy has had two songs that have been featured on the TV series Scrubs, and one on the series Arrested Development. His song "New World" was featured on the 10 Things I Hate About You soundtrack.  His song "Good Time" was featured in the films Driven and Laurel Canyon. In the summer of 2008, he joined Smash Mouth as a guitarist to replace Greg Camp, who had just left the band.

In 2003, he appeared on John Mayer's album Heavier Things, performing additional programming on the track "Split Screen Sadness".

Albums
 Leroy (2001)
 Squish (2005)
 Walla Walla (2007)
 Don't Make Me Beg (2010)
 Temple (2013)
 Off the Rails (2015)
 Let It Ride (2019)

References

External links

1965 births
American rock guitarists
American male guitarists
Living people
People from Walla Walla, Washington
Smash Mouth members
Guitarists from Washington (state)
20th-century American guitarists
Geffen Records artists
Hollywood Records artists